Ba'athist Revolution may refer to:
Ramadan Revolution
1963 Syrian coup d'état
1966 Syrian coup d'état
17 July Revolution
Corrective Movement (Syria)